This article concerns the period 99 BC – 90 BC.

References